SS Bingera was a steamship that provided the mail service between Brisbane, Gladstone and Townsville in Queensland, Australia.

History
Workman, Clark and Company of Belfast, Ireland built her in 1905 in for the Australian United Steam Navigation Company.

The SS Bingera was the first turbine steamer to sail Australian waters.

Once the railway to Townsville was built in 1926, the mail travelled by rail and the ship was no longer needed. On 28 November 1929 it was dumped on the beach of Bishop Island at the mouth of the Brisbane River, (now incorporated into the Port of Brisbane), after all sellable parts were removed.

References

External links

1901 – World War I ships of Australia
1905 ships
Interwar period ships of Australia
Coastal passenger vessels of Australia
Ships built in Belfast